Möhrenbach is a village and a former municipality in the district Ilm-Kreis, in Thuringia, Germany. Since 31 December 2013, it is part of the municipality Gehren.

References

Former municipalities in Thuringia